Mahyar Mohyeddin a.k.a. Mahyar Dean  (Persian: مهیار محی الدین ) is a musician, guitarist, guitar instructor, author, and founding member of the Iranian/ American heavy metal act Angband, the first such band to be signed to a label.

Biography 
Mahyar Mohyeddin was born in Tehran, where he ended playing acoustic and electric guitar. he took lessons in music composition under the mentorship of professor Houshang Ostovar.

Books 
He wrote books about the bands Death in 2000 and Testament in 2001.

The book Death, about the band Death and its founder Chuck Schuldiner, was released in Iran in Persian. The book includes bilingual lyrics and many articles about the band. The book was sent through the EmptyWords.org site to Schuldiner, who in his own words was "truly blown away and extremely honored by the obvious work and devotion he put into bringing the book to life".

The group Angband 
In 2004, he established the power metal/progressive musical group Angband, which is the first signed metal band from Iran, signed to the Pure Steel label. They have released four albums with Mahyar Dean as the guitarist and producer.

Works

Books 

 Death -
 Testament -

Albums with Angband 

 Rising from Apadana - (2008) 
 Visions of the Seeker - (2010)
 Saved from the Truth - (2012)
 IV - (2020)

Albums with others 
 Ramin Rahimi - Persian Percussion Electrified (2012)

Equipment 
Jackson kelly guitar
Marshall amp

References

External links 
 Angband on Facebook
 Angband on Youtube

Living people
Lead guitarists
Iranian guitarists
Heavy metal guitarists
People from Tehran
Year of birth missing (living people)